(The) Two Boys may refer to:

 The Two Boys (1924 film), French silent film directed by Louis Mercanton
 The Two Boys (1936 film), French drama film directed by Fernand Rivers
 Two Boys, 2011 American opera
 Two-Boys Gumede (born 1985), South African footballer